Vladimir Porfirievich Nagornov (born November 29, 1956, Bogdashkino, Tsilninsky District, Ulyanovsk Oblast, USSR) — Soviet and Russian sculptor and portrait painter, Honored artist of the Russian Federation, people's artist of the Chuvash Republic.

Biography
Vladimir Nagornov was born on November 29, 1956 in the village of Bogdashkino (Tsilninsky District, Ulyanovsk Oblast). In 1984 he settled in Cheboksary (most of his creations are connected with this city).

References

External links 
 Official website of sculptor Vladimir Nahornov
 Vladimir Nagornov in Chuvash encyclopedia
 Владимир Порфирьевич Нагорнов  / персоналии на Listo.ru

1956 births
Living people
People from Ulyanovsk Oblast
Soviet sculptors